Lamellitrochus cancapae is a species of sea snail, a marine gastropod mollusk in the family Solariellidae. The size of the shell attains 10 mm. This species occurs in the Atlantic Ocean off the Azores.

References

 ilvens C. & Swinnen F. (2007). Description of a new Solariella species (Gastropoda: Trochoidea: Solariellidae) from the Azores. Novapex 8(3–4): 123–126

External links
 

cancapae
Molluscs of the Azores
Gastropods described in 2007